Kim Yeong-hui (born 23 December 1955) is a South Korean speed skater. She competed in three events at the 1980 Winter Olympics.

References

1955 births
Living people
South Korean female speed skaters
Olympic speed skaters of South Korea
Speed skaters at the 1980 Winter Olympics
Speed skaters from Seoul